Events from the year 1977 in Denmark.

Incumbents
 Monarch – Margrethe II
 Prime minister – Anker Jørgensen

Events
15 February – The 1977 Danish parliamentary election is held.

Sports
 1421 Susanne Nielsen wins a silver medal in  Women's 200 metre breaststroke at the 1977 European Aquatics Championships.

Badminton
 26 March  Flemming Delfs wins gold in men's single at the 1977 All England Open Badminton Championships.
 38 May  Denmark wins three gold medals, one silver medal and one bronze medal at the 1977 IBF World Championships.

Date unknown
 Ole Ritter (DEN) and Patrick Sercu (BEL) win the Six Days of Copenhagen sox-day track cycling race.

Births

 14 March – Ida Corr, singer
 2 April – Nicki Pedersen, speedway rider
 17 April – Frederik Magle, composer
 31 May – Joachim Olsen, shot putter and politician
 26 July – Martin Laursen, football player
 12 August – Jesper Grønkjær, football player
 14 October – Tina Dico, singer-songwriter
 19 November – Mette Frederiksen, politician
 14 December – Kirsten Brosbøl, politician
 16 December – René Redzepi, chef, co-founder of NOMA

Deaths
 4 January – Princess Margaretha of Sweden (born 1899 in Sweden)
 1 May – Arne Sørensen, footballer (born 1917)
 4 June – Svend Methling, actor (born 1891)
 25 November  Jonas Bruun, lawyer (born 1911)

See also
1977 in Danish television

References

 
Denmark
Years of the 20th century in Denmark
1970s in Denmark